Joseph W. Dailey (February 17, 1917 – July 5, 2007) was a United States Marine who served as the 5th sergeant major of the Marine Corps from August 1, 1969, until he retired from active duty on January 31, 1973. Dailey was the oldest living former sergeant major of the Marine Corps when he died in 2007. Dailey served in combat in three wars—World War II, the Korean War, and the Vietnam War—earning the Silver Star for actions during the Battle of Okinawa and the Navy Cross and the Bronze Star Medal for heroism in Korea. He was a member of the Church of Jesus Christ of Latter-day Saints.

Early life
Born February 17, 1917, in Black Mountain, Arkansas, Dailey enlisted in the United States Marine Corps Reserve in 1941 at Portland, Oregon, and underwent recruit training at the Marine Corps Recruit Depot San Diego in California.

Military career
During World War II, Dailey served with the 1st Battalion, 1st Marines, 1st Marine Division, and participated in combat operations in Eastern New Guinea; Bismarck Archipelago; Western Caroline Islands and on Okinawa. He was awarded the Silver Star for conspicuous gallantry in action against the enemy while serving as acting gunnery sergeant of Company A, 1st Battalion, 1st Marines on Okinawa on May 3, 1945.

Upon his return to the United States, Dailey was discharged from the Marine Corps Reserve on November 23, 1945. On June 18, 1948, he re-enlisted in the Marine Corps Reserve, and was promoted to the rank of staff sergeant. He remained inactive until October 1950, when ordered to active duty at the Marine Corps Base, Camp Pendleton in California, where he served as a company first sergeant with the 4th Infantry Training Battalion. He was promoted to technical sergeant in August 1951.

In October 1952, Dailey joined the 1st Marine Division in Korea, where he earned the Navy Cross for extraordinary heroism while serving as platoon leader with Company F, 2nd Battalion, 5th Marines, 1st Marine Division on February 25, 1953; the Bronze Star Medal with Combat "V" and the Purple Heart for wounds received on March 26, 1953, while serving as company gunnery sergeant with Company F. Dailey integrated into the Regular Marine Corps in 1953 and was promoted to master sergeant in August 1953.

Following his return to the United States in December 1953, Dailey was again assigned to the Marine Corps Recruit Depot in San Diego, and served, successively, as company first sergeant and company gunnery sergeant with Communications-Electronics Schools Battalion. From July 1955 until November 1956, he served as the first sergeant with the Marine Detachment, USS Bremerton. He next became battalion sergeant major of the 3rd Battalion, 7th Marines, 1st Marine Division, Camp Pendleton, through June 1959. He was promoted to first sergeant on December 30, 1955, and to sergeant major on December 31, 1955.

Dailey reported to Houston, Texas, where he was assigned duty as sergeant major on the Inspector-Instructor Staff, 1st Battalion, 23rd Marine Regiment, 4th Marine Division serving in that capacity until July 1962. Ordered to the Marine Corps Base, Camp Lejeune, North Carolina, he saw duty as regimental sergeant major with the 2nd Marines, 2nd Marine Division. He deployed with the 2nd Marines during the Cuban contingency operations.

In August 1963, Dailey reported to Headquarters Marine Corps in Washington, D.C., for duty as G-3 Division sergeant major until May 1964. For the next two years, he served as post sergeant major at Marine Barracks, Washington, D.C.

Detached in July 1966, Dailey arrived in the Republic of Vietnam the following month, where he became battalion sergeant major, 2nd Battalion, 1st Marines, 1st Marine Division. In November 1966, he was medically evacuated from Vietnam as a result of injuries sustained in a vehicle accident. In July 1968, he returned to the Republic of Vietnam, where he served as battalion sergeant major of the 11th Engineer Battalion, 3rd Marine Division, III Marine Amphibious Force until November of that year. He then served as the 3rd Marine Division sergeant major until July 1969. He earned the Navy Commendation Medal with Combat "V" for his service during the latter tour.

Later life
Dailey died in Newport Beach, California, on July 5, 2007, at age 90. He is survived by his wife, two daughters, fourteen grandchildren and 8 great-grandchildren.

Awards and decorations
Dailey's military decorations include:

Navy Cross citation

Silver Star citation
Citation:

The President of the United States of America takes pleasure in presenting the Silver Star to Sergeant Joseph W Dailey (MCSN: 335540), United States Marine Corps Reserve, for conspicuous gallantry and intrepidity while serving as Acting Gunnery Sergeant of Company A, First Battalion, First Marines, FIRST Marine Division, in action against enemy Japanese forces on Okinawa, Ryukyu Islands, on 3 May 1945. During an attack in which his company was suffering severe casualties, Platoon Sergeant Dailey skillfully organized the personnel of company headquarters and the mortar platoon into stretcher-bearer teams and led them into the fire-swept zone, constantly exposing himself to heavy fire in order to direct the evacuation of the wounded. Realizing that more stretchers were needed, he crossed the hazardous area and commandeered Marines from a reserve unit to aid his company and, leading them through lanes of enemy fire, succeeded in moving all the casualties to a comparatively safe position. By his leadership, initiative and untiring devotion to duty, Platoon Sergeant Bailey contributed materially to the success of the operation, and upheld the highest traditions of the United States Naval Service.

References

External links

1917 births
2007 deaths
Military personnel from Arkansas
Sergeants Major of the Marine Corps
United States Marine Corps personnel of World War II
United States Marine Corps personnel of the Korean War
United States Marine Corps personnel of the Vietnam War
Recipients of the Navy Cross (United States)
Recipients of the Silver Star
Recipients of the Gallantry Cross (Vietnam)
United States Marine Corps reservists